Alcmène was 26-gun frigate of the French Navy, designed by Doumet, lead ship of her class. She notably took part in the War of American Independence.

Career 
In 1775, Alcmène cruised in the Caribbean with the 18-gun corvette Flèche. In 1776, she was under Suffren.

In 1778, she was part of the French expeditionary forces to America, under Bonneval, and blockaded Rhodes Island.  In August, she destroyed a British corvette and two galley, along with Aimable.

On 16 August 1779, Alcmène was sent to escort a convoy, along with the 64-gun Protecteur and the 50-gun Fier. A storm scattered the escort and damaged Alcmène, which had to throw most of her guns overboard to stay afloat. On 20 October 1779, as Alcmène was nearing Martinique, she encountered HMS Proserpine which captured her.

Fate 
The British took Alcmène in service as HMS Alcmene. She was sold in 1784.

Citations and references 
Citations

References
 
  (1671-1870)

Frigates of the French Navy
1774 ships
Ships built in France